Devon Powers (born 1977 or 1978) is an American communication studies professor, author, and former music journalist.

Biography
Powers was born in 1977 or 1978. Her father, Lee R. Powers, is an engineer and her mother, Mandy Powers, is a nurse. In 2007 she married lawyer David Bennion. Powers is African American.

In 1999, she earned a Bachelor of Arts degree in English and women's studies from Oberlin College and, in 2008, a Ph.D. in media studies from New York University.

Between 2001 and 2004, she worked as a freelance music journalist, largely writing for PopMatters.

, she is an associate professor at the Klein College of Media and Communication at Temple University. Her research interests include consumer culture (historical and contemporary) and shifts in cultural intermediation, circulation and promotion.

She has written two books, Writing the Record: The Village Voice and the Birth of Rock Criticism (2013) and On Trend: The Business of Forecasting the Future (2019) and, with Melissa Aronczyk, co-edited Blowing Up the Brand: Critical Perspectives on Promotional Culture (2010).

Writing the Record
In 2013, University of Massachusetts Press published Writing the Record: The Village Voice and the Birth of Rock Criticism. In the monograph, a reworking of her doctoral thesis, Powers provides a deeply researched analysis of the challenging relationship between critics and the rise of pop culture in the 1950s through the 1970s. To tell this story, she focuses on the careers of Richard Goldstein and Robert Christgau, both writers at New York's famed Village Voice. Powers argues that these music journalists should be considered public intellectuals, even though they weren't traditional academics.

Powers was influenced to study the topic because of her own work as a music journalist. She says she tested many of her ideas about the social function of music criticism in a regular column she wrote for PopMatters titled More Than Words: Musings on Music Journalism.

On Trend
In 2019, University of Illinois Press published On Trend: The Business of Forecasting the Future, a study of the cultural economy of the trend analysis and futurology industry. Powers employed ethnographic research methods, visiting forecasting companies such as Sparks & Honey and conducting dozens of interviews to collect material for the book. Scott McLemee notes that the book shines a light on the largely opaque but influential trend-spotting industry.

On Trend was selected as a 2020 Choice Outstanding Academic Title.

References

External links

1978 births
Living people
Oberlin College alumni
Steinhardt School of Culture, Education, and Human Development alumni
Temple University faculty
Communication scholars
American social scientists
American women social scientists
African-American social scientists
21st-century American non-fiction writers
American women non-fiction writers
American music journalists
African-American women journalists
20th-century African-American women
20th-century African-American people
21st-century African-American women writers
21st-century American women writers
21st-century African-American writers